Economic repression in the Soviet Union included the forced collectivization or dekulakization of industry with the intention of artificially stimulating economic growth or confiscating property from individuals for the distribution of wealth. These policies were particularly prevalent during the Stalin era, where economically repressive policies contributed to the Holodomor.

History

Stalinism 

After the Soviet grain procurement crisis of 1928, the Soviet Union issued a number of measures with the intent to stimulate farming and grain production. These included the launch of the country's Five-year plans, and began the dekulakization of Ukrainian farms under Joseph Stalin. The sudden mass collectivization of property and food from the Kulaks was the primarily contributing favor to the widespread famine commonly known as the Holodomor. These were followed by some resistance in the form of peasant uprisings, but they were later crushed and a large amount of participants executed. Mass executions and famines as a direct result of the first initial collectivizations led to the deaths of approximately 400,000 people.

References

Sources 

 

Economic history of the Soviet Union
Agriculture in the Soviet Union